De la Vega is a surname in the Spanish language, most of its bearers belonging to the nobility. It means "of the meadow" and may refer to:

People
(arranged by date of birth)
 Garci Lasso de la Vega I, Cantabrian noble who was executed by Alfonso XI of Castile in 1326
 Garci Lasso de la Vega II, Cantabrian noble who was assassinated by Peter of Castile in 1351
 Garci Lasso Ruiz de la Vega, Cantabrian noble who was killed at the Battle of Nájera, 1340–1367
 Leonor Lasso de la Vega, (1367–1432) Cantabrian noblewoman,
 Garcilaso de la Vega (poet) (1501–1536), Spanish noble poet and soldier
 Inca Garcilaso de la Vega (1539–1616), Peruvian noble poet and writer
 Gabriel Lobo Lasso de la Vega (1558–1615), Spanish epic poet, playwright and historian
 Francisco Laso de la Vega (1568–1640), Spanish soldier and governor of Chile 1629–1639
 Luis Laso de la Vega (c. 1622–?), Mexican author, priest and lawyer 
 Melchor Portocarrero, 3rd Count of Monclova (1636–1705), viceroy of New Spain 1686–1688
 Joseph de la Vega (c. 1650–1692), Spanish merchant, poet, and philanthropist, later moved to Amsterdam
 Diego de la Vega (Contador), (c. 1770–1812), Spanish nobleman and accountant
 Francisco Cajigal de la Vega (c. 1715–?), Spanish governor of Cuba
 Rómulo Díaz de la Vega (c. 1800–1877), an interim president of Mexico in 1855
 Daniel de la Vega (1892–1971), Chilean poet and playwright
 José Tadeo Mancheño y Laso de la Vega, (1784–1855) Chilean political figure
 Luis Ignacio de la Vega (c. 1914–?), Mexican Olympic basketball player
 Óscar Únzaga de la Vega (1916–1959), a Bolivian socialist politician
 Jorge de la Vega (1930–1971), an Argentine painter
 Aurelio de la Vega (b. 1925), a Cuban-American composer
 Sabas Pretelt de la Vega (b. 1946), Colombian economist and former Minister of the Interior and Justice
 María Teresa Fernández de la Vega (b. 1949), Spanish Socialist Workers' Party politician and former minister
 Ralph de la Vega (b. 1951), the Chief Operating Officer of Cingular Wireless
 Jacqueline de la Vega (b. 1960), Mexican TV show host in Spain and former model
 Guadalupe Arizpe de la Vega, Mexican humanitarian
 James De La Vega, New York City graffiti artist
 Florencia de la V or Florencia de la Vega (b. 1976), Argentine transgender actress and vedette
 Diego de la Vega (footballer), (b. 1979), Argentinean footballer
 Cynthia de la Vega (b. 1991), Mexican model and beauty pageant titleholder

Fiction
 Zorro, the secret identity of Don Diego de la Vega in the series by American writer Johnston McCulley
 Usnavi De La Vega, a character in the 2008 play In the Heights by writer Lin Manuel Miranda
 Rogelio de la Vega, a character in the series Jane the Virgin

Places

Dominican Republic
 Concepción de La Vega, a city in the central part of the Dominican Republic
 La Vega Province, Concepción de la Vega province of the Dominican Republic

Jamaica
 Spanish Town, or St. Jago de la Vega, the former capital of Jamaica

Peru
 Estadio Garcilaso de la Vega, the principal stadium in Cusco, Peru

Spain
 Alcalá de la Vega, a municipality in Cuenca, Castile-La Mancha, Spain
 Osa de la Vega, a municipality in Cuenca, Castile-La Mancha, Spain
 Fresno de la Vega, a small village in county León, Spain

See also
La Vega (disambiguation)
Las Vegas (disambiguation)
House of Lasso de la Vega

Surnames of Spanish origin
Spanish-language surnames